Palmen aus Plastik is the first collaborative studio album by German rapper Bonez MC and Austrian rapper RAF Camora, released on September 9, 2016, byAuf!Keinen!Fall! and Indipendenza. The follow-up, Palmen aus Plastik 2 was released on October 5, 2018.

Background
Bonez MC and RAF Camora first worked together on RAF Camoras studio album Ghøst (2016). They announced the album live at the Splash! Festival, during the performance of the 187 Strassenbande. The album was officially confirmed on July 9, 2016, by Auf!Keinen!Fall!. Parts of the album, were created during a trip to Jamaica.

Track listing

Charts

Weekly charts

Year-end charts

Certifications

References

2016 albums
Bonez MC albums
RAF Camora albums